Malaysian Indians have served in the Cabinet of Malaysia since independence and continue to do so.

Tun Samy Vellu is one of the longest serving ministers in the Cabinet of Malaysia. He held the post of Minister of Public Works and Utilities from 1979 to 2008. Following his departure from the cabinet, he was appointed Special Envoy of Infrastructure to India and South Asia.

Gobind Singh Deo is the first Malaysian Sikh cabinet minister.

List of Ministers 
This is a complete list of ethnic Indians who have served as Ministers in the Cabinet of Malaysia, ordered by seniority. This list includes ethnic Indians who served in the past and who continue to serve in the present.

List of Deputy Ministers

References 

Cabinet of Malaysia